Dirt Farmer is an album by American musician Levon Helm, former drummer for the music group called The Band. The album was released on October 30, 2007, on Vanguard Records, and was Helm's first studio album since 1982. It was produced by guitarist Larry Campbell (who, like Helm, worked with Bob Dylan) and by Helm's daughter, Amy, both of whom also sing and perform on the album. It won the Grammy Award for Best Traditional Folk Album in February 2008.

Track listing
"False Hearted Lover Blues" (Traditional) – 3:29
"Poor Old Dirt Farmer" (Tracy Schwarz) – 3:52
"The Mountain" (Steve Earle) – 3:35
"Little Birds" (Traditional) – 4:41
"The Girl I Left Behind" (Traditional) – 3:36
"Calvary" (Byron Isaacs) – 4:53
"Anna Lee" (Laurelyn Dossett) – 3:43
"Got Me a Woman" (Paul Kennerley) – 3:11
"A Train Robbery" (Paul Kennerley) – 5:28
"Single Girl, Married Girl" (A. P. Carter) – 3:18
"The Blind Child" (Traditional) – 3:26
"Feelin' Good" (J. B. Lenoir) – 3:31
"Wide River to Cross" (Buddy & Julie Miller) – 4:52

Personnel 

Larry Campbell – dulcimer, acoustic guitar, fiddle, mandolin, percussion, arranger, background vocals, producer, guitar
Georgette Cartwright – creative services coordinator
Ahron R. Foster – photography
Justin Guip – engineer, mixing
Amy Helm – mandolin, percussion, piano, arranger, drums, vocals, background vocals, producer, harmony vocals, mandola
Levon Helm – acoustic guitar, mandolin, arranger, drums, vocals, liner notes
Byron Isaacs – bass, percussion, background vocals
Buddy Miller – harmony vocals
Julie Miller – harmony vocals
Brian John Mitchell – piano, accordion, background vocals
Glenn Patscha – pump organ
George Receli – percussion
Doug Sax – mastering
Carrie Smith – art direction, design
Teresa Williams – background vocals, harmony vocals

References

2007 albums
Albums produced by Larry Campbell (musician)
Covers albums
Levon Helm albums
Vanguard Records albums